There's a Good Time Coming is a popular poem written by Charles Mackay and set to music by Henry Russell and was one of that composer of popular music's best-known works in the middle of the nineteenth century.

There's a good time coming, boys, a good time coming:

We may not live to see the day, but Earth shall glisten in the ray of the good time coming:

Cannonballs may aid the truth, But thought's a weapon stronger:

We'll win our battle with its aid;- Wait a little longer.

Independent testimony quoted by John Dodds indicates that the song was popular with new immigrants to the United States; it was recorded as being sung on the emigrant ships as they approached New York Harbor.

The pen shall supersede the sword,

And right not might, shall be the lord

In the good time coming;

Worth, not truth, shall rule mankind,

And be acknowledged stronger...

References

British poems
19th-century songs
Year of song unknown
Songs with music by Henry Russell (musician)